The public trust doctrine is the principle that the sovereign holds in trust for public use some resources such as shoreline between the high and low tide lines, regardless of private property ownership.

Origins

Justinian
The ancient laws of the Byzantine Emperor Justinian held that the sea, the shores of the sea, the air and running water were common to everyone. The seashore, later defined as waters affected by the ebb and flow of the tides could not be appropriated for private use and was open to all.

England

This principle became the law in England as well. Centuries later, Magna Carta further strengthened public rights.  At the insistence of English nobles, fishing weirs which obstructed free navigation were to be removed from rivers.

United States

These rights were further strengthened by later laws in England and subsequently became part of the common law of the United States. The Supreme Court first accepted the public trust doctrine in Martin v. Waddell’s Lessee in 1842, confirming it several decades later in Illinois Central Railroad v. Illinois, 146 U.S. 387 (1892).  In the latter case the Illinois Legislature had granted an enormous portion of the Chicago harbor to the Illinois Central Railroad. A subsequent legislature sought to revoke the grant, claiming that original grant should not have been permitted in the first place.  The court held that common law public trust doctrine prevented the government from alienating the public right to the lands under navigable waters (except in the case of very small portions of land which would have no effect on free access or navigation).

The public trust applies to both waters influenced by the tides and waters that are navigable in fact.  The public trust also applies to the natural resources (mineral or animal) contained in the soil and water over those public trust lands.

Application
This doctrine has been primarily significant in two areas: land access and use, and natural resource law.

Access to ocean and ponds

The doctrine is most often invoked in connection with access to the seashore.  In the United States, the law differs among the fifty states but in general limits the rights of ocean-front property owners to exclude the public below the mean high tide line.

Massachusetts and Maine (which share a common legal heritage) recognize private property ownership to the mean low tide line—but allow public access to the seashore between the low and high tide lines for "fishing, fowling and navigation," traditional rights going back to the Colonial Ordinance of 1647.  Maine's Supreme Court in 2011 expanded the public trust doctrine by concluding fishing, fowling and navigation are not an exclusive list; the court allowed the general public to cross private shoreline for scuba diving.

The public trust doctrine also finds expression in the Great Pond law, a traditional right codified in case law and statutes in Massachusetts, Maine, and New Hampshire.  The state is said to own the land below the low water mark under great ponds (ponds over ten acres), and the public retains in effect an access easement over unimproved private property for uses such as fishing, cutting ice, and hunting.

In Oregon, a 1967 "Beach Bill" affirmed the state's public trust doctrine, and the right of the public to have access to the seashore virtually everywhere between the low and high tide marks.  In California the situation is more complicated:  private landowners often try to block traditional public beach access, which can result in protracted litigation.  Freshwater use rights have also been subject to litigation in California, under the public trust doctrine.

In England and Wales, there is no general public right to access the foreshore. Most land between the high and low water marks is owned by the Crown Estate, who permit access for recreation, but the courts confirmed in 1821 in the case of Blundell v Catterall that there is no right of access such as the public trust doctrine. The only public right over the foreshore is to pass over it, on water in a boat, for the purposes of fishing.

Natural resources
The doctrine has also been used to provide public access across and provide for continued public interest in those areas where land beneath tidally influenced waters has been filled.  In some cases, the uses of that land have been limited (to transportation, for instance) and in others, there has been provision for public access across them.

The doctrine has been employed to assert public interest in oil resources discovered on tidally influenced lands (Mississippi, California) and has also been used to prevent the private ownership of fish stocks and crustacean beds.

In most states in the United States, lakes and navigable-in-fact streams are maintained for drinking and recreation purposes under a public-trust doctrine.

In some countries, the public trust doctrine has been applied to provide environmental protection to natural resources in order to uphold human rights. A recent study also demonstrated that public trust doctrines are transnationalizing.

See also
Prescriptive easement
Freedom to roam
Illinois Central Railroad Co. v. Illinois
Juliana v. United States
M. C. Mehta v. Kamal Nath
National Audubon Society v. Superior Court
Public trust
Public good
Public space
Public property
Right of way

Further reading

Notes

External links
 
 
James L. Huffman, "Fish Out of Water: The Public Trust Doctrine in a Constitutional Democracy " Issues in Legal Scholarship, Joseph Sax and the Public Trust (2003): Article 6.
 
 

Property law
Environmental law
Public law
Legal doctrines and principles